Sleeping Bear Dunes National Lakeshore is a United States National Lakeshore located along the northwest coast of the Lower Peninsula of Michigan in Leelanau and Benzie counties near Empire, Michigan. The park covers a  stretch of Lake Michigan's eastern coastline, as well as North and South Manitou islands. This Northern Michigan park was established primarily because of its outstanding natural features, including forests, beaches, dune formations, and ancient glacial phenomena. The lakeshore also contains many cultural features including the 1871 South Manitou Island Lighthouse, three former stations of the Coast Guard (formerly the Life-Saving Service) and an extensive rural historic farm district. In 2011, the area won the title of "The Most Beautiful Place in America" from Good Morning America. In 2014, a section of the park was named the Sleeping Bear Dunes Wilderness by the United States Congress.

Federal decision to preserve lakeshore
The park was authorized on October 21, 1970. The park's creation was controversial because it involved the transfer of private property to public ownership. The federal government's stance at the time was that the Great Lakes were the "third coast" and had to be preserved much like Cape Hatteras or Point Reyes, which are National Seashores. The residents living in what is now Sleeping Bear Dunes National Lakeshore believed themselves to be stewards of the land and did not want it to be overrun by tourists. The government eventually won out, in part by supporting the local schools to offset the lost property tax revenue and by including North Manitou Island in the national lakeshore area.

In 2014,  of the park were formally designated as the Sleeping Bear Dunes Wilderness by the Sleeping Bear Dunes National Lakeshore Conservation and Recreation Act. This was the first wilderness protection bill to be passed by the United States Congress in five years.

History of the name
The park is named after an Ojibwe legend of the sleeping bear. According to the legend, an enormous forest fire on the western shore of Lake Michigan drove a mother bear and her two cubs into the lake for shelter, determined to reach the opposite shore. After many miles of swimming, the two cubs lagged behind. When the mother bear reached the shore, she waited on the top of a high bluff. The exhausted cubs drowned in the lake, but the mother bear stayed and waited in hopes that her cubs would finally appear. Impressed by the mother bear's determination and faith, the Great Spirit created two islands (North and South Manitou islands) to commemorate the cubs, and the winds buried the sleeping bear under the sands of the dunes where she waits to this day. The "bear" was a small tree-covered knoll at the top edge of the bluff that, from the water, had the appearance of a sleeping bear. Wind and erosion have caused the "bear" to be greatly reduced in size over the years.

Historic sites

Glen Haven Village

Glen Haven existed as a company town from 1865 to 1931. Originally a dock for Glen Arbor (1855-date), the site soon became a fuel supply point for ships traveling up and down the lake. Here, Charles McCarty decided to open his own business and built a dock to supply the ships with wood. In 1863, McCarty built the Sleeping Bear House. It was expanded a few years later to accommodate travelers. In 1928, it was remodeled into the inn for summer vacationers. The General Store was established to supply the workers. Like most company towns, the workers were paid in company coupons, redeemable only at the company store. The Blacksmith Shop is where tools were repaired. In 1878, David Henry Day arrived in the community. By this time, coal from the Appalachian coal fields was replacing wood on the steamships. Day was looking for another future to this small community.

Port Oneida Historic Farm District

In 1860, Port Oneida had a population of 87 people. Thomas Kelderhouse had built a dock to sell wood to the passing steamships. He was also able to sell fresh produce and maple sugar in season. A local story says that the name comes from the first ship to stop, the SS Oneida of New York State. The farming community was gradually abandoned due to hard farming conditions and declining timber sales.

Climate

Camping
Sleeping Bear Dunes National Lakeshore is one of Michigan's most popular destinations for camping vacations, possibly the most popular. This popularity may be due to the fact it was named the "Most Beautiful Place in America" by Good Morning America in 2011. There are a few campgrounds in the national lakeshore and they are grouped into D.H. Day Campground, Platte River Campground, a few camping areas on the Manitou Islands within, and some other sites for backcountry or group camping.

D.H. Day Campground
D.H. Day Campground is part of Sleeping Bear Dunes National Lakeshore and offers a moderate level of privacy and a beach on Lake Michigan. Campsites are rustic, wooded, and more far apart than campsites at most campgrounds. Nearby points of interest include Empire Bluffs, the "dune climb", and North Bar Lake. Campsites 1–31 allow the use of a generator, the remaining sites forbid generator use.

Platte River Campground
Platte River Campground is part of Sleeping Bear Dunes National Lakeshore and offers a variety of campsites. Some campsites are modern (with electrical hookups), some are "hike-in," and others are more rustic. Nearby points of interest include Platte River Point, the Platte River, and Big Platte Lake. The north section of Sleeping Bear Dunes National Park is a short drive from Platte River Campground. Kayaking is a popular activity at the campground, especially the kayak trail leading from the campground to Platte River Point

Manitou Island campgrounds
Sleeping Bear Dunes also has three main campgrounds on South Manitou Island, including the Weather Station Campground located on the south side of the island, the Bay Campground on the west shore of the island and the Popple Campground on the north shore.

Other camping areas nearby
In addition to federal campgrounds within the national lakeshore itself, there are many other camping areas nearby, which cater to the large number of tourists visiting Sleeping Bear Dunes each year. There are at least 20 distinct camping areas in the region immediately surrounding Sleeping Bear Dunes.

Fauna 
The piping plover, a federally registered endangered species, nests at Sleeping Bear Dunes National Lakeshore.

Dune climb 
The main dune climb is located across from Glen Lake. Visitors who travel by car will be required to buy a day pass or annual pass from the National Park Service. The dune climb is also accessible by foot or by bike. Water stations are located along the base of the main dune, along with a restroom and gift shop. Hikers can hike all the way to Lake Michigan.

Gallery

See also

 Sand dune
 Pierce Stocking Scenic Drive
 List of areas in the National Park System of the United States

References

Further reading

External links

 National Park Service: Sleeping Bear Dunes National Lakeshore
 Sleeping Bear Dunes National Lakeshore: Final General Management Plan, Wilderness Study Environmental Impact Statement
 Traverse City Convention and Visitors Bureau
 North Manitou Island
 Sleeping Bear Dunes Visitors Bureau
 The Sleeping Bear Organization
 Aerial Video of Sleeping Bear Dunes National Lakeshore

 
Protected areas of Benzie County, Michigan
Landmarks in Michigan
Protected areas of Leelanau County, Michigan
Tourism in Michigan
Protected areas established in 1970
Important Bird Areas of Michigan
Beaches of Michigan
Landforms of Leelanau County, Michigan
Landforms of Benzie County, Michigan
Dunes of Michigan
1970 establishments in Michigan